Deidre Marie Hulse Henderson (born September 4, 1974) is an American politician serving as the ninth lieutenant governor of Utah since January 4, 2021. From 2013 to 2021, she served as member of the Utah State Senate for District 7, which is based in Spanish Fork, Utah.

Early life and education
Deidre Henderson graduated from Taylorsville High School in Taylorsville, Utah. While pursuing a bachelor's degree in history from Brigham Young University, she was her own intern.
She graduated from BYU in 2021.

Career 
Before joining the Utah State Senate, Henderson worked as a business consultant, and was involved in U.S. Congressman Jason Chaffetz's 2008 campaign.

Henderson started her political career working for the Jason Chaffetz election campaign. In 2012, Henderson was selected from among two candidates by the Republican convention and was unopposed for the November 6, 2012 General election, winning with 27,257 votes. This district formerly consisted of the East bench of the Salt Lake Valley and was held by Democratic Senator Ross I. Romero who retired from the Senate in 2012. The Utah State Legislature's 2012 redistricting plan moved District 7 from the Salt Lake Valley to the Southern portion of Utah County.

She was sworn into office in January 2013. In 2016, Henderson defeated her Democratic opponent, Andrew Apsley, with 83.65% of the vote to Apsley's 16.35%. and re-elected in 2016.

In the Senate, Henderson served on the Committee on Rule. Revenue and Taxation, Education, Business, Labor, and Economic Development Appropriations, and Higher Education Appropriations.

Henderson ran to replace Jason Chaffetz in the U.S. Congress representing Utah's 3rd congressional district in 2017. Henderson lost to State Representative Chris Herrod in the Republican convention.

Lieutenant Governor of Utah 

On March 19, 2020, Henderson was selected as the running mate of incumbent Lieutenant Governor Spencer Cox in the 2020 Utah gubernatorial election Republican primary. After Cox won the Republican primary, Henderson became the Republican nominee for Lieutenant Governor.

Personal life 
She married Gabe Henderson and they have five children. Henderson is a member of the Church of Jesus Christ of Latter-day Saints.

References

Further reading
Government officials visit Sierra Bonita in Nebo School District 
The Utah Capitol: A Vision of Pride and Beauty Speech given on the Utah Senate Floor by Senator Henderson

External links
Official page at the Utah State Senate
Campaign site
Deidre Henderson at Ballotpedia
SB108: Protecting Birthing Centers from Protectionist Prohibitions Interview with Senator Henderson about her bill, SB108, from the 2016 Legislative Session

|-

1974 births
21st-century American politicians
21st-century American women politicians
Brigham Young University alumni
Latter Day Saints from Utah
Lieutenant Governors of Utah
Living people
People from Spanish Fork, Utah
Place of birth missing (living people)
Republican Party Utah state senators
Women state legislators in Utah
Candidates in the 2017 United States elections